Jack William Sommers (February 9, 1917 – September 1975) was an American football offensive lineman in the National Football League for the Washington Redskins.  He played college football at UCLA and was drafted in the eleventh round of the 1941 NFL Draft by the Chicago Cardinals.

References 

1917 births
1975 deaths
American football centers
Sportspeople from Pennsylvania
UCLA Bruins football players
Washington Redskins players